Nikasala Aranya Senasanaya or Nikasala Forest Hermitage (Sinhalaː නිකසල ආරණ්‍ය සේනාසනය) is an ancient Cave temple in Panduwasnuwara DS, Sri Lanka. The temple is situated at Dematawakanda in Kanduboda-Moragane Village, about  far from the ancient kingdom of Panduwasnuwara. The monastery has been formally recognised by the Government as an archaeological site in Sri Lanka. The designation was declared on 6 July 2007 under the government Gazette number 1505.

See also
Tomb of Vijaya

References

External links

 
Nikasala Nuwara Tomb of King Vijaya at Kande Medagama Rajamaha Viharaya

Buddhist temples in Kurunegala District
Buddhist caves in Sri Lanka
Archaeological protected monuments in Kurunegala District